Hanna Łyczbińska (born 20 April 1990) is a Polish foil fencer. She represented her country at the 2016 Summer Olympics.

In 2019, she won the bronze medal in the women's team event at the Military World Games held in Wuhan, China.

She competed at the 2022 European Fencing Championships held in Antalya, Turkey.

References 

1990 births
Living people
Polish female foil fencers
Fencers at the 2016 Summer Olympics
Olympic fencers of Poland
Sportspeople from Toruń
Universiade medalists in fencing
Universiade bronze medalists for Poland
Medalists at the 2017 Summer Universiade
20th-century Polish women
21st-century Polish women